Pat Courtney Gold (January 22, 1939 – July 11, 2022) was a Wasco Native fiber artist and basket weaver from the Columbia River area of Oregon. She graduated with a BA in mathematics and physics from Whitman College and worked as a mathematician-computer specialist before beginning her career in basket weaving. Gold harvested traditional plant fibers to use in her work—including Dogbane, cattail, sedge grass, red cedar bark and tree roots. Her pieces often reflected the natural world along the Columbia River, mixing traditional motifs such as condors and sturgeon with contemporary figures like airplanes. Gold also became an environmental and cultural educator, helping to spread knowledge of her ancestral heritage and basketry skills.

Gold's art is exhibited in museums around the world, including the High Desert Museum, Royal British Columbia Museum, Peabody Museum of Archaeology and Ethnology at Harvard University and Smithsonian National Museum of the American Indian. 

She was featured in a 2007 episode of the PBS series Craft in America.

Personal life 
Gold was born and raised on the Warm Springs Reservation in central Oregon. Her mother was an accomplished beadworker, and they would visit local art museums where their ancestors' baskets were on display. She graduated from Madras High School in 1957.

As a child, Gold did not see anyone around her using traditional weaving techniques and had no idea that would one day become her career. She worked as a mathematician for nearly 17 years before she decided to change course and focus on reviving the culture and art of her people.

In 1991, through the Oregon Traditional Arts Apprenticeship Program, Gold began to study the making of "sally bags," flexible cylindrical baskets created by Wasco-Wishram people for gathering roots and medicines, as well as nuts, seeds and mushrooms. Gold diagrammed historical basket designs and learned about the stories they told, encompassing the symbolism of fishing nets, petroglyphs and other ancestral scenes. She learned the full turn twining technique used to weave the bags and has since become one of the foremost experts and teachers keeping this style alive today.

Published works

Awards and honors
Gold received an Oregon Governor's Arts Award in 2001. She earned a Community Spirit Award in 2003 and Cultural Capital Fellowship in 2004 from the First People's Fund. She was a recipient of a 2007 National Heritage Fellowship awarded by the National Endowment for the Arts, which is the United States government's highest honor in the folk and traditional arts.

References

External links 
 

1939 births
2022 deaths
Women basketweavers
Native American basket weavers
Artists from Oregon
Whitman College alumni
Mathematicians from Oregon
National Heritage Fellowship winners
Native American people from Oregon
20th-century American mathematicians
20th-century women mathematicians
20th-century American artists
20th-century American women artists
21st-century American artists
21st-century American women artists